Kathy Jordan and Pam Shriver were the defending champions but only Shriver competed that year with Martina Navratilova.

Navratilova and Shriver won in the final 6–4, 6–3 against Jo Durie and Barbara Potter.

Seeds
Champion seeds are indicated in bold text while text in italics indicates the round in which those seeds were eliminated.

 Martina Navratilova /  Pam Shriver (champions)
n/a
 Jo Durie /  Barbara Potter (final)
 Ann Kiyomura /  Paula Smith (quarterfinals)

Draw

External links
 1983 Virginia Slims of Houston Doubles Draw

Virginia Slims of Houston
1983 Virginia Slims World Championship Series